A mass murder of Sri Lankan Police officers took place on 11 June 1990. Members of the Liberation Tigers of Tamil Eelam (LTTE), a militant organization, are alleged to have killed over 600 unarmed Sri Lanka Police officers in Eastern Province, Sri Lanka. Some accounts have estimated the number killed as high as 774.

Background

Indian intervention
According to the Indo-Sri Lankan Accord, Indian Peace Keeping Force (IPKF) arrived in Sri Lanka in July 1987. Their presence in the country was not very popular among the Sri Lankan public and the politicians. In January 1989, President Ranasinghe Premadasa's government was elected.  President Premadasa's initial intention was to work out a peace plan with the LTTE, which was waging a bloody separatist campaign in the country's north and east. Premadasa too was unhappy with the Indian presence in Sri Lanka. In June 1989, he entered into a ceasefire agreement with the LTTE. In an attempt to win over its leadership, Premadasa transferred a large quantity of weapons to the organization (at their request), to fight against the IPKF.  And in late 1989, Premadasa asked the IPKF to depart, due to the adverse public opinion. Indian Prime Minister Vishwanath Pratap Singh consented and withdrew his force.

Breakdown of peace talks
Meanwhile, a Sri Lankan government delegation led by the Minister of Foreign Affairs Abdul Cader Shahul Hameed held peace talks with the LTTE. Although the talks seemed successful at the initial stages, no agreement was made on critical issues like the dissolution of the Northeast Provincial Council and repealing of the Sixth Amendment to the constitution. LTTE chief political strategist and chief negotiator Anton Balasingham threatened the government, stating that "this is the last chance we give you. If you fail, we are prepared to wage war". The situation worsened after Sri Lankan Minister of Defence Ranjan Wijeratne asked the LTTE to lay down arms. LTTE leader Velupillai Prabhakaran refused and hostilities between the government and the LTTE began to increase.

Preceding events
During this time, the  Army was confined to the military camps. No action was taken against any of the LTTE activities for fear that peace talks would break down. But tension began to escalate by late May 1990. The army found that LTTE had constructed bunkers, dug trenches, and implemented other defense measures closer to the camps. But the Defense Ministry had instructed the Army to keep mute.

Thandikulam incident
On 7 June 1990, a vehicle carrying Army personnel from Vavuniya to Mullaitivu was fired at by the LTTE. One soldier died and nine were injured. But the Defense Ministry instructed to take no action.

Massacre
On 11 June 1990, at about 6:00 a.m., LTTE surrounded the Batticaloa police station and abducted 3 policemen. About an hour later, around 250 armed LTTE cadres occupied the police station. Then the Sinhalese police officers along with their families were sent to the airport. Tamil Police officers were taken to the St Mary's Church, with their families. The acting officer-in-charge and four other policemen were detained. LTTE also removed Rs. 45 million in cash, gold jewellery, 109 T 56 rifles; 77 T 84S rifles; 28 light machine guns; 29 self-loading rifles; 65 submachine guns; 78 .303 rifles and 78 SAR 80 guns from the police station.

LTTE ordered all police stations in Eastern Province to be vacated by 2:30 p.m. or face the consequences. The inspector general of Police, Ernest Perera, also instructed the police officers to surrender, at the request of President Ranasinghe Premadasa. Police officers laid down their arms after being promised safe conduct and subsequent release.

Then the Sinhalese officers were sent to the Army or Air Force camps while Tamil officers were accommodated at schools. Meanwhile, the LTTE abducted 899 officers. About 125 were able to escape. Prisoners were taken to the Vinayagapuram and Trincomalee jungles. Once they had arrived, the LTTE cadres lined up the officers, tied their hands behind their backs and shot them dead. In all, 600 to 774 police officers died.

But not all the officers complied at once. ASP Ivan Boteju, who was the OIC of Kalmunai police station, refused to surrender and kept on fighting with the LTTE from 3:00 p.m. to 6:00 p.m. He protested insisting that they "would be tortured if not killed [if they surrendered]". Within that period, he repeatedly requested air support and artillery support but was denied. At about 5:20 p.m. the IGP personally contacted Botheju, ordered them to cease firing and surrender. When they had laid down their arms, LTTE took over and all communications with the Colombo Police headquarters were lost. Then the LTTE cadres took them to the Tirukkovil jungles and executed them.

In Kalmunai, LTTE also fired at an Army convoy, killing ten Army soldiers. It was reported that 324 police officers who died were Sinhalese and Muslim. All of them were taken to the Tirukovil jungles by the LTTE, blindfolded, hands tied, made to lie down on the ground, and shot. It was later found out that these police officers were massacred using the weapons that R. Premadasa had clandestinely given the LTTE.

Aftermath
Sri Lanka's chief peace negotiator Minister Shahul Hameed's attempts to rescue the officers in detention went in vain. This massacre officially put an end to the ceasefire between the government and the LTTE. On 18 June 1990, the Minister of Defence Ranjan Wijeratne announced from the floor of the parliament, "From now on, it is all out war and no half ways". It was the start of the Eelam War II. As a result of the LTTE attacks, Army had to abandon camps including Kokavil, Mankulam, Killinochchi, Kondachchi and Silavathurai. This, together with the abandonment of Police stations, resulted in a huge loss of territory to the government. LTTE had also managed to cut off the land route to Jaffna Peninsula. LTTE was in charge of most of the area in North and Eastern provinces by July 1990. Before this incident, LTTE had no conventional fighting capabilities. During Eelam War I, LTTE was merely a guerilla outfit.

At the time of this massacre, LTTE's peace delegation comprising Jude – an LTTE communication specialist – and two military wing cadres were at Hilton Colombo. Then they were moved to a military camp at Kalutara, under heavy security of Special Task Force. They were returned to the LTTE a few days later without any harm. According to Major General Sarath Munasinghe's book A Soldiers Version, the LTTE radio operator [Jude] had a message from Prabhakaran: "Whatever happens, ensure that the money offered is brought with you".

The massacre provoked revenge riots in the Gal Oya valley, instigated by policemen. 26 Tamils were killed by Sinhalese mobs.

Further reading
 Gunaratna, Rohan. (1998). Sri Lanka's Ethnic Crisis and National Security, Colombo: South Asian Network on Conflict Research. 
 Gunaratna, Rohan. (1 October 1987). War and Peace in Sri Lanka: With a Post-Accord Report From Jaffna, Sri Lanka: Institute of Fundamental Studies. 
 Munasinghe, Sarath. (2000). A soldier's version, Sri Lanka: Market Information Systems. 
 Seneviratne, Tassie. (2011). Human Rights & Policing – Reminiscences of My Police Days
 Gunasekara, S.L. (4 November 2003). The Wages of Sin, 
 Gunasekara, S.L. (1996). Tigers moderates and pandora's package, Sri Lanka Freedom Party. 
 Senanayake, P.M. (2010). "Sri Lanka- The War Fuelled by 'Peace'"

References

External links
There are 600 plus (murdered) Police officers inside the one you see today

1990 mass shootings in Asia
1990 murders in Sri Lanka
20th-century mass murder in Sri Lanka
Attacks on buildings and structures in Sri Lanka
Attacks on police stations in the 1990s
Crime in Eastern Province, Sri Lanka
History of Eastern Province, Sri Lanka 
June 1990 crimes
June 1990 events in Asia
Liberation Tigers of Tamil Eelam attacks in Eelam War II
Massacres in 1990 
1990 police
Terrorist incidents in Sri Lanka in 1990
Indian Peace Keeping Force